Pinoy M.D. is a Philippine television informative show broadcast by GMA Network. Hosted by Connie Sison, David Ampil II, Raul Quillamor, Oyie Balburias and Jean Marquez, it premiered on June 12, 2010.

Premise
The show provides information on diseases and medical concerns of the people nowadays. It also provides free on-air consultation for the viewers, which was later discontinued.

Hosts
 Connie Sison
 David Ampil II
 Raul Quillamor
 Oyie Balburias
 Jean Marquez

Segment host
 Suzy Entrata

Production
In March 2020, production was halted due to the enhanced community quarantine in Luzon caused by the COVID-19 pandemic. The show resumed its programming on September 15, 2020.

Accolades

References

External links
 
 

2010 Philippine television series debuts
Filipino-language television shows
GMA Network original programming
GMA Integrated News and Public Affairs shows
Philippine medical television series
Television productions suspended due to the COVID-19 pandemic